Wongo is a Bantu language in Kasai-Occidental Province, Democratic Republic of the Congo.

References

Languages of the Democratic Republic of the Congo
Bushoong languages